Pan Suk Kim (born 1956) is a South Korean professor in the field of public administration. He is currently a commission member of the International Civil Service Commission of the United Nations and the International Director of the American Society for Public Administration. Kim is currently a professor emeritus of Public Administration in the Department of Global Public Administration, Yonsei University, Mirae Campus in South Korea.

Kim's research interests include theories and practices of public administration, public governance, and human resources management and development. He was a Fulbright Scholar in the Department of Government at Georgetown University in 2005, a visiting scholar in residence in the School of Public Affairs at the American University in 2015, and a visiting scholar in the Trachtenberg School of Public Policy and Public Administration at George Washington University in 2020.

Education and career
Kim received his BA degree in public administration from Chung-Ang University in 1982, M.P.A. (Master of Public Administration) from the Florida International University in 1984, and Ph.D. degree from the American University in 1990. He is an elected lifetime international fellow of the National Academy of Public Administration(NAPA), a congressionally chartered non-partisan non-profit academy in Washington, D.C. He had led a number of professional associations including the Korean Society for Public Personnel Administration(KOSPPA, 1999–2000) as well as regional and international associations including the Asian Association for Public Administration (AAPA, 2014–2017) and the International Institute of Administrative Sciences (IIAS, 2010–2013). He was a member of the United Nations Committee of Experts on Public Administration (UNCEPA) in New York for two terms (2006-2009 and 2010-2013) and was a Vice Chairperson of UNCEPA in 2010–2013. He was the editor-in-chief of the Asian Review of Public Administration (ARPA, published by the Eastern Regional Organization for Public Administration) and the Korean Policy Studies Review (KPSR), and a deputy editor of the International Review of Administrative Sciences (IRAS). He has been named Underwood Distinguished Professor from 2010 to 2013, and was the Dean of
the College of Government and Business at Yonsei University. Kim was the founding director of the Institute of Poverty Alleviation and International Development (IPAID) at Yonsei University in 2010–2013.

Government experience
Kim has broad experience as an expert in governmental affairs. He was the Minister of Personnel Management (MPM, 인사혁신처) in the Republic of Korea from July 2017 to December 2018. Prior to that, he was a Secretary to the President for Personnel Policy in the Office of the President from December 2003 to January 2005.

Selected publications
Kim has published over 200 refereed articles in Korean and international journals and also authored several books. He edited a number of books, including the following: 
Public Administration and Public Governance in ASEAN Member Countries and Korea (Seoul: Daeyoung, 2009)
Civil Service System and Civil Service Reform in ASEAN Member Countries and Korea (Seoul: Daeyoung, 2010) 
Public Sector Reform in ASEAN Member Countries and Korea (Seoul: Daeyoung, 2011); 
Value and Virtue in Public Administration (UK: Palgrave Macmillan, 2014; co-edited with Michiel de Vries); 
Democratic Governance, Public Administration and Poverty Alleviation (Brussels, Belgium: Bruylant, 2015; co-edited with Demetrios Argyriades).

Selected awards and honors
Kim was recognized for his contribution and received several awards, including the following:

International Public Administration Award (2009), awarded by the American Society for Public Administration.
Paul P. Van Riper Award for Excellence and Service (2012), awarded by the American Society for Public Administration.
Warner W. Stockberger Achievement Award (2017), awarded by the International Public Management Association for Human Resources.
Donald C. Stone Service to ASPA Award (2019), awarded by the American Society for Public Administration.
Fred W. Riggs Award for Lifetime Achievement in International & Comparative Public Administration (2019), awarded by the Section of International and Comparative Administration of the American Society for Public Administration.

Bibliography
Kim, B. W. and Kim, Pan Suk. 1997. Korean Public Administration: Managing the Uneven Development. Elizabeth, NJ: Hollym.
 De Vries, Michiel and Kim, Pan Suk. (eds.). 2011. Value and Virtue in Public Administration: A Comparative Perspective. London, UK: Palgrave Macmillan. 
 Kim, Pan Suk and Argyriades, Demetrios. (eds.). 2015. Democratic Governance, Public Administration and Poverty Alleviation: Thematic Discourse and Geographical Cases. Brussels, Belgium: Bruylant.

References 

American University alumni
Public administration scholars
Academic staff of Yonsei University
Florida International University alumni
Living people
Chung-Ang University alumni
1956 births
Academic journal editors
South Korean expatriates in the United States